"Wildest Horses" is a song performed by Spanish singer-songwriter Barei. The song was released as a digital download on 24 April 2014 through Wildest Horses as the third single from her second studio album Throw the Dice (2015). The song peaked at number 36 on the Spanish Singles Chart.

Music video
A music video to accompany the release of "Wildest Horses" was first released onto YouTube on 24 April 2014 at a total length of three minutes and thirty-three seconds.

Track listing

Chart performance

Weekly charts

Release history

References

2014 songs
2014 singles